Haywood Early College is a public high school located on the campus of Haywood Community College. Haywood Early College High School enrolls students in grades 9 through 13.  Students who complete the full program earn both a high school diploma and a two-year transfer degree.

History
Haywood Early College opened in the fall of 2006 supported by a grant from the Bill and Melinda Gates Foundation and in collaboration with the North Carolina New Schools Project.

It serves a population of approximately one hundred and ninety students.

Academics
Haywood Early College has achieved considerable academic success.  HEC earned an A rating from the state for the 2013–2014 academic year, SchoolDigger ranked HEC 29th out of 503 North Carolina high schools, and was recognized as a National Blue Ribbon School in 2018.

External links
 Haywood Early College

References

Clyde, North Carolina
Public high schools in North Carolina
Schools in Haywood County, North Carolina